James "Red" R. Davis (born April 22, 1932) is a retired professional basketball player who spent one season in the National Basketball Association (NBA) as a member of the Rochester Royals during the 1955–56 season. He attended St. John's University where he played on their basketball team. He was drafted by the Royals in the sixth round of the 1954 NBA draft.

External links

Living people
1932 births
Basketball players from New York City
Centers (basketball)
Forwards (basketball)
Rochester Royals draft picks
Rochester Royals players
St. John's Red Storm men's basketball players
Sportspeople from Manhattan